The 2003 Central Michigan Chippewas football team represented Central Michigan University in the Mid-American Conference (MAC) during the 2003 NCAA Division I-A football season. In their fourth and final season under head coach Mike DeBord, the Chippewas compiled a 3–9 record (1–7 against MAC opponents), finished in last place in the MAC's West Division, and were outscored by their opponents, 428 to 277. The team played its home games in Kelly/Shorts Stadium in Mount Pleasant, Michigan, with attendance of 83,512 in six home games.

The team's statistical leaders included Derrick Vickers with 1,345 passing yards, Jerry Seymour with 1,117 rushing yards, and Justin Harper with 441 receiving yards. Defensive back James King was selected at the end of the 2003 season as the team's most valuable player.

On December 17, 2003, Mike DeBord resigned as the Chippewas' head football coach. He compiled a 12-34 record in four years in the position.

Schedule

Roster

References

Central Michigan
Central Michigan Chippewas football seasons
Central Michigan Chippewas football